This list is of the Cultural Properties of Japan designated in the category of  for the Prefecture of Kōchi.

National Cultural Properties
As of 1 June 2015, twenty Important Cultural Properties (including one *National Treasure) with sixty component structures have been designated, being of national significance.

Prefectural Cultural Properties
As of 1 May 2014, eleven properties have been designated at a prefectural level.

Municipal Cultural Properties
As of 1 May 2014, eighty-eight properties have been designated at a municipal level.

Registered Cultural Properties
As of 1 June 2015, two hundred and seventy-three properties at ninety-four sites have been registered (as opposed to designated) at a national level.

See also
 Cultural Properties of Japan
 National Treasures of Japan
 List of Historic Sites of Japan (Kōchi)
 List of Cultural Properties of Japan - paintings (Kōchi)
 List of Cultural Properties of Japan - historical materials (Kōchi)

References

External links
  Cultural Properties in Kochi Prefecture

Cultural Properties,Kochi
Buildings and structures in Kōchi Prefecture
Kochi
Structures,Kochi